Lieutenant General Surinder Singh, PVSM, AVSM & Bar, VSM is a retired officer of Indian Army who served as General Officer Commander-in-Chief (GOC-in-C), Western Command. He took office of the Chairman, Punjab Public Service Commission on 21 August 2019.

Early life and education 
Singh is an alumnus of National Defence Academy, Pune and Indian Military Academy, Dehradun. He has also attended National Defence College, New Delhi and the Higher Command Course at Staff College, Camberley (Surrey).

Career 
Singh was commissioned into 2nd Battalion Brigade of the Guards in 1979. He has vast experience counter insurgency and operational environments. He has taught at The Infantry School, Mhow and College of Military Engineering, Pune. He has commanded an Armoured Brigade, a Division in a Strike Corps and a Mountain Corps in SikkimXXXIII Corps (Sukhna). He has also held staff appointments at the Military Operations Directorate, the Perspective Planning Directorate at the Army Headquarters, 
He has also served as a Team Leader of military observers with the UN mission in Liberia and has had other key operational roles.

He assumed the office of General Officer Commander-in-Chief (GOC-in-C), Western Command on 17 September 2016, and served in the same capacity till 31 July 2019. 

During four decades of his career, he has been awarded the Vishisht Seva Medal in 2010, the Ati Vishisht Seva Medal in 2015, Bar to Ati Vishisht Seva Medal in 2017 and the Param Vishisht Seva Medal in 2019. He was also ‘The Colonel’ of the Brigade of The Guards.

After his retirement from Indian Army, Singh was appointed Chairman of Punjab Public Service Commission.

Honours and decorations

Dates of rank

References 

Living people
Indian generals
Year of birth missing (living people)
National Defence College, India alumni
Recipients of the Param Vishisht Seva Medal
Recipients of the Ati Vishisht Seva Medal
Recipients of the Vishisht Seva Medal
Graduates of the Staff College, Camberley